Ludwig Worman (1761 – October 17, 1822) was a Federalist member of the United States House of Representatives from Pennsylvania.

Worman was born in Tinicum Township, Pennsylvania.  He learned the tanning business.  He moved to Earl Township, Berks County, Pennsylvania, in 1784 and established a tannery.

Worman was elected as a Federalist to the Seventeenth Congress and served until his death.  Before his death, he was an unsuccessful candidate for reelection in 1822 to the Eighteenth Congress.  He died in Earl Township in 1822 and was interred in Earl Township Cemetery.

See also
List of United States Congress members who died in office (1790–1899)

Sources

The Political Graveyard

1761 births
1822 deaths
Federalist Party members of the United States House of Representatives from Pennsylvania